Hadhrat Ahmad is an English-language biography of Mirza Ghulam Ahmad, the founder and first Khalifatul Masih of the Ahmadiyya Muslim Community, written by his successor, Mirza Basheer-ud-Din Mahmood Ahmad. The book was first published in 1967, and re-issued in 1985, 1995 and 1998.

Summary
The following points are explained by the author in this book, related to the life of Mirza Ghulam Ahmad.
The early chapters of the book explain about his background and his early life including his birth, childhood and studies.
In the next part of the book, his professional life is explained.
The book next explains his services as a religious scholar including his famous book Barahin-e-Ahmadiyya.
The author then explains about Mirza claiming to be the Promised Messiah and Mahdi and the rest of his life.

References

1967 books
American biographies
Books of Islamic biography
Works by Mirza Basheer-ud-Din Mahmood Ahmad